Központi Sport- és Ifjúsági SE is a water polo club from Budapest, Hungary. The team competes in the Országos Bajnokság I.

Team

Current squad
Squad for the 2013–14 season

Technical staff

Notable former players
 Attila Sudár
 György Kenéz
 Tibor Benedek
 Zsolt Varga
 Tamás Märcz
 Attila Vári
 Barnabás Steinmetz
 Tamás Kásás
 Ádám Steinmetz

External links
 

Sport in Budapest
Water polo clubs in Hungary